Kenneth Malcolm Owen (born 23 April 1970) is an English drummer. He was born in Billinge and grew up in Gayton, Merseyside. He is best known as one of the founding members of extreme metal band Carcass, for which he also handled some of the vocals. After the band broke up in 1995, he started Blackstar, along with two other Carcass members. In February 1999, he suffered a brain haemorrhage at home and spent ten months in a hospital slowly emerging from a coma, making it impossible at the time for him to continue playing drums. More recently, he has started playing drums again, but mostly makes music using the computer software program Reason.

He remains close to Carcass and its members: in 2008, he joined Carcass on stage at the Sweden Rock Festival 2008, Wacken Open Air festival 2008, Damnation Festival 2008 & 2013, 2009 at Bloodstock Open Air and in 2010 at Vagos Open Air to play a short drum solo. Jeff Walker has noted Owen's influence on the album Surgical Steel; Owen appears on the album contributing some backing vocals, as well as in the music video for Unfit for Human Consumption. In September 2015, he released his first solo album, Symbiotic Possibilities, which is a techno album recorded using Reason software.

Owen is a vegan.

References 

1970 births
Living people
English heavy metal drummers
Death metal musicians
Carcass (band) members
21st-century drummers
Grindcore musicians